Masters M85 marathon world record progression is the progression of world record improvements of the marathon M85 division of Masters athletics.  Records must be set in properly conducted, official competitions under the standing IAAF rules unless modified by World Masters Athletics.  

The M85 division consists of male athletes who have reached the age of 85 but have not yet reached the age of 90, so exactly from their 85th birthday to the day before their 90th birthday.  Marathon running is not normally seeded into age divisions so all of these records were set in marathon race open to most other age groups.

Key

References

Masters Athletics Marathon list

Masters athletics world record progressions
Marathon world records